Frank Erdman Boston (March 10, 1890 – February 8, 1960) was an American physician in Philadelphia and Lansdale, Pennsylvania.

He served in World War I (as a part of the Medical Reserve Corps) in the 317th Infantry. He served in France with the rank captain and ended his military service as a major. After the war, he worked in Philadelphia and then moved to Lansdale, Pennsylvania, founding an ambulance corps and the North Penn Hospital (1954).

Early life
Boston was born in Philadelphia, Pennsylvania, to parents Charles A. Boston and Julia Sands on March 10, 1890.  Frank was the youngest as he had an older brother, named Edgar, and an older sister, named Mae. Frank was educated and raised entirely in Philadelphia before entering Lincoln University. After graduating from college, he attended Medico Chirurgical College. Boston finished his medical studies in 1915 and received certification in 1916, where he specialized in surgery. Frank began his medical career as an intern in Roosevelt Hospital.

Boston's first confrontation with the media was in May 1916, where he had been criticized by the local coroner's office after the death of a young boy. The boy had come in after a car accident with a massive head injury and because the hospital lacked an X-ray machine, Boston took it upon himself to drive the injured boy to the nearest equipped hospital. After the X-ray Boston performed on the boy, however, the child did not survive. In the article Frank defends the actions of his colleagues and him:

Boston took a position as surgeon in Mercy Hospital, while maintaining a private practice in Philadelphia.  He even opened his own medical practice in Lansdale.

Military service
In 1917, the United States joined World War I and the entire nation was in a buzz to join the effort. After the declaration of war with Germany, many African-Americans were turned away from the local recruiting stations. Unprepared for a large scale conflict, the United States Army had only four black regiments, and many commanders would not allow mixing of blacks and whites in their units. Also, the black regiments themselves were not trusted to be sent to Europe, as many of the higher ups possessed a lack of confidence in black soldiers as fighters. Fort Des Moines Provisional Army Officer Training School had been opened for training African-American men as there had been a huge influx of African-American volunteers and a petition was erected by the students of Howard University. However, there was still some discontent at the facility as many soldiers found that he had been unfairly assessed for merely being black.

When Boston answered the military's call for physicians he was immediately given the rank, First Lieutenant in the Army Medical Reserve Corps. Like all the African-American recruits, Lieutenant Boston was sent to Fort Des Moines for medical training at the Medical Officers Training Camp. After completing his training, Lieutenant Boston was assigned as a medical officer with the 317th Engineers Regiment of the 92nd Division.
 
Before leaving for France, Lieutenant Boston spent additional time in Camp Sherman, Ohio, where his abilities and rigor were so well recognized that he was promoted to Captain.

When arriving at France, Captain Boston found a large amount of work on his plate. The 317th Engineering Regiment was the other option for black citizens wanting to enlist into work. Most African-American soldiers had been assigned to noncombatant engineer units that performed dangerous and hard jobs of digging trenches, forming roads, and fortification against the Germans. Captain Boston spent his time in France busy taking care of sick men and those heavily injured from building, as the Germans were becoming more aggressive in late 1918.  Later, Captain Boston would display his extraordinary skill as a surgeon.

After the conclusions of the war, Captain remained at his commission in the Medical Reserve Corps.  While there Cpt. Boston was in communication with author W.E.B Du Bois. Four surviving letters exist to confirm the correspondence.  When the war ended Du Bois sought out and interviewed many African American soldiers for a scheduled book on their experiences.  In a letter Du Boise sent to Captain Boston on April 16, 1919:

There is evidence that Du Bois eagerly sought the chance to interview Cpt. Boston as indicated in an earlier letter.
At the time Captain. Boston was living in 813 N. 16th Street, Philadelphia, and in one of his letter to Du Bois, he replied:
	

It is unknown whether an actual occurred between the two men, but there was a constant correspondence, as Du Bois's interest in the African-American effort in World War I increased. As a result of speaking with Cpt. Boston and other African American soldiers, Du Bois had found discovered that there was a large amount of racism very prominent in the U.S. Army. He noted, especially, how many African-Americans were discouraged from joining the military and were not often credited for their accomplishments as compared to white soldiers of the same rank.

In 1919, Boston was given the rank of Major and he was even a member of the Association of Military Surgeons.  Major Boston was discharged in the later months of 1919.

Career
When Boston left the military he returned to Philadelphia, Pennsylvania, to continue work on his medical practice in Philadelphia county. Boston placed a large emphasis in providing medical assistance and education towards the community.  He had been a member of the American Medical Association, the Philadelphia County Medical Society, the International College of Surgeons, and the National Medical Association.  At the 1926 annual convention, Boston was listed as chairman of the Committee for Gynecologists and General Surgeons in the Journal of the National Medical Association and proceeded to open stations at Mercy Hospital for well-known surgeons to operate.

Boston was often involved in Veteran fundraisers and dedicated work toward Veterans of Foreign Wars. In 1934, Boston opened a Hospital in Lansdale called the Elm Terrace Hospital, which would later be renamed North Penn Hospital in 1954 and eventually becoming part of the Jefferson Health Systems. It is now known as the Lansdale Abington Hospital. Boston continued his association with Mercy Hospital during the 1930s, participating in various clinical lectures and was credited for it in the Chicago Defender.

Boston formed a First Aid Emergency Squad in Lansdale, now called the Volunteer Medical Services Corps (VMSC) dedicating many hours to that venture.

Personal life
Boston never married.

Death
In 1960, Boston died in at the age of 69 in Einstein Medical Center. Upon his death, his many peers from both the hospital and the Emergency Relief Squad came to sing at his grave. Boston was buried in Whitemarsh Cemetery in Pennsylvania. The First Baptist Church in Lansdale, Pennsylvania established a memorial consisting of a sculpture made by S.K. Miller, which exists today at 7th & Broad Streets in Lansdale. On June 8, 2022, the PA state legislature voted to designate part of State Route 2004 in Lansdale and Hatfield the Dr. Frank Erdman Boston Memorial Highway.

References

1890s births
1960 deaths
African Americans in World War I
20th-century African-American physicians
American primary care physicians
Lincoln University (Pennsylvania) alumni
United States Army personnel of World War I
United States Army Medical Corps officers
African-American United States Army personnel